The 2011 South American U-20 Championship was an international football tournament held in Peru from 26 January to 6 February 2011. The ten national teams involved in the tournament were required to register a squad of twenty players; only players in these squads were eligible to take part in the tournament.

Each national team had to present a list of players by 6 January 2011. Each player had to have been born after 1 January 1991.

Players' names marked in bold have been capped at full international level.

Argentina
Coach: Wálter Perazzo

(Source for player names:)

Bolivia
Coach: Marco Sandy

Brazil
Coach: Ney Franco

Chile
Coach: César Vaccia

Colombia
Coach: Eduardo Lara

Ecuador
Coach: Sixto Vizuete

Paraguay
Coach: Adrian Coria

Peru
Coach: Gustavo Ferrín

Uruguay
Coach: Juan Verzeri

Venezuela
Coach: Marcos Mathias

References

External links
Official list of players

South American U-20 Championship squads